Bright Lights of Broadway is a surviving 1923 American silent drama film directed by Webster Campbell. An independent film it stars Doris Kenyon, Harrison Ford, and Lowell Sherman.

A print of Bright Lights of Broadway survives with the Library of Congress.

Cast
Doris Kenyon as Irene Marley
Harrison Ford s Thomas Drake
Edmund Breese as Reverend Graham Drake
Claire de Lorez as Connie King
Lowell Sherman as Randall Sherrill
Charles Murray as El Jumbo
Effie Shannon as Mrs. Grimm, Landlady
Tyrone Power as John Kirk

References

External links

1923 films
American silent feature films
American black-and-white films
Silent American drama films
1923 drama films
Films with screenplays by Gerald Duffy
Films produced by B. F. Zeidman
Films directed by Webster Campbell
1920s American films
1920s English-language films